Aglaostigma is a genus of sawflies belonging to the family Tenthredinidae.

The genus was described in 1882 by Kirby.

The species of this genus are found in Europe and Northern America.

Species:
 Aglaostigma aucupariae (Klug, 1817)
 Aglaostigma fulvipes (Scopoli, 1763)
 Aglaostigma langei
 Aglaostigma nebulosum

References

Tenthredinidae